Kilmarnock railway station (Scottish Gaelic: Stèisean rèile Chille Mheàrnaig) is a railway station in Kilmarnock, East Ayrshire, Scotland. The station is managed by ScotRail and is served by trains on the Glasgow South Western Line. One of the earliest railway stations in Scotland, the Kilmarnock and Troon Railway opened on 6 July 1812, until it was replaced by the Glasgow, Paisley, Kilmarnock and Ayr Railway on 4 April 1843.

History

Opening

The first station in Kilmarnock was opened by the Kilmarnock and Troon Railway on 6 July 1812, one of the earliest stations in Scotland.

The third and current station was opened on 20 July 1846 by the Glasgow, Paisley, Kilmarnock and Ayr Railway – this was connected to Ardrossan via  two years later and to  via Dumfries & Gretna Junction in 1850. The current route to Glasgow (via ) – the Glasgow and Kilmarnock Joint Railway was completed in 1871 jointly by the G&SWR and Caledonian Railway.

Services on the Irvine branch and via the old main line to Dalry both fell victim to the Beeching Axe in the mid-1960s – the former closed to passengers on 6 April 1964 (and to all traffic in October 1965) and local trains on the latter were withdrawn on 18 April 1966 .  Services to the G&SWR terminus at Glasgow St Enoch also ended soon after (on 27 June), with services henceforth running to and from Glasgow Central.  The old K&T line also lost its passenger service for several years (local trains ended on 3 March 1969), but these were subsequently reinstated in May 1975 when the boat trains from Stranraer to Carlisle were diverted from their former route via Annbank & Mauchline.  The Dalry line remained in use for freight and occasional long-distance passenger trains until 23 October 1973, when it was closed to all traffic and subsequently dismantled.

Current operations and station description 

The station is built well above street level and is accessed via either a subway and stairs or a more circuitous but step-free route along a narrow access road. Network Rail undertook a project to install lifts which started in February 2018 and was completed in January 2019.

The station has a total of four platforms; two north-facing bays for both terminating Glasgow services and trains on the Glasgow to Stranraer via Kilmarnock route, on which trains reverse out of the station towards the junction with the Troon line. Two through platforms serve through services between Glasgow, Dumfries, Carlisle and Newcastle. Platform 3 is used for most of the services between Glasgow and Carlisle/ Newcastle via Dumfries in both directions however platform 4 does see some use. Platform 3 and 4 are 57 miles from Dumfries and 89 miles from Carlisle.

The bay platforms (1 and 2) as well as Platform 3 are covered by a partly glazed roof and directly accessible from the ticket office. Platform 4 is accessed via a subway and stairs, and afforded only a bus stop style shelter although it does have a departure board.

Facilities
The station is fully staffed seven days a week, with the ticket office open from 06:30 (Mon-Sat)/10:15 Sundays until 23:30.  A self-service ticket machine is also provided for use outside opening hours and for collecting pre-paid tickets.  Other amenities on offer in the main buildings include toilets, a vegan deli, a shop selling Scottish food and gifts, an Active Travel HUB, waiting room and public wi-fi access.  Train information is offered via CIS displays, timetable posters, automated announcements and customer help points.  Step-free access is available to platforms 1-3 only.

Signalling 

The present Kilmarnock signal box is located north of the station, in the vee of the junction. Opened on by British Rail on 12 April 1976, it is a plain brick building containing an NX (entrance-exit) panel on the upper storey. It replaced four mechanical signal boxes in a scheme that saw the track layout greatly simplified. Originally, the box worked Track Circuit Block to Hurlford signal box and Scottish Region Tokenless Block over the single lines to Barassie Junction and Lugton signal boxes. Kilmarnock signal box was severely damaged in a suspected arson attack on 25 December 2006 but was repaired and returned to full operation within weeks.

The train service to Glasgow is partly limited by the single track northwards as far as Lochridge Junction (near Stewarton). This formerly extended all the way as far as Barrhead (with just one  loop at Lugton) following track rationalisation in the early 1970s and restricted the frequency of services that could be operated.  A "dynamic passing loop" (in effect a redoubling of the section between Lugton and ) was installed to help rectify this in 2009. The service frequency was increased to half-hourly from the 13 December 2009 timetable change.

New sidings were installed in 2009-2010 along a short section of the trackbed of the old route to Dalry to facilitate the increased coal train traffic.

Features of the station

Kilmarnock railway viaduct 

Constructed from 1843 until 1850, the Kilmarnock railway viaduct is a bridge crossing the town centre of Kilmarnock.

It is a most distinctive feature of the town centre with 23 masonry arches.

At present, the viaduct is currently lit by blue lights when it is dark, which makes it more of a noticeable feature in the town. This was part of the Kilmarnock town centre regeneration. The programme carried out on the viaduct was considered a "success".

In April 2012, the bridge's safety was upgraded after a man was seriously injured after jumping 40 ft from the top of the railway viaduct.

Kilmarnock station clock 

Outside of the railway station, a clock is operated by East Ayrshire Council and ScotRail. In 2011, the clock received a grant from the Railway Heritage Trust to undergo a regeneration scheme that began in late 2011 and was completed in March 2012.

Despite an expensive upgrade in 2008, it was announced in December 2022 following a full cabinet meeting of East Ayrshire Council that the station clock at the Kilmarnock railway station was to be removed and landscaped "with immediate affect" due to continuous technical difficulties preventing the clock and its LED lighting from working properly.

Services

December 2021–present 

On Monday to Saturdays: There are 2 trains per hour to/from Glasgow for most of the day with journey times taking between 40 and 50 minutes depending the service taken.

Monday to Saturday: 
There are 8 trains per day south of Kilmarnock towards Dumfries and Carlisle, 6 trains go to Carlisle (one train continues to Newcastle) and 2 trains  go to Dumfries. These operate to a roughly 2 hourly frequency however the frequency is uneven so gaps of up to 3 hours are possible at certain times of the day.

There are 6 trains per day to Girvan, 4 of which continue to Stranraer, (and all call at Ayr) running a to a 2 to 4 hourly frequency (with peak extras).

Sundays:
On Sundays, There is 1 train per hour to Glasgow calling at stations, There is a limited service of just 2 trains per day to Dumfries and Carlisle, There is no service to/from Ayr or Stranraer

Due to Lamington Viaduct on the West Coast Mainline being severely damaged by the Storms of 2015-16, Virgin Trains services from Carlisle were diverted along the Glasgow South Western Line and called at Kilmarnock en route to Glasgow Central. These were irregularly scheduled services and ceased once Lamington Viaduct was repaired and the WCML reopened on 22 February 2016.

Routes

References

External links
 YouTube video of Kilmarnock Junction, Station and Wabtec Rail works

Category B listed buildings in East Ayrshire
Listed railway stations in Scotland
Railway stations in East Ayrshire
Former Glasgow and South Western Railway stations
Railway stations in Great Britain opened in 1812
Railway stations in Great Britain closed in 1843
Railway stations in Great Britain opened in 1843
Railway stations in Great Britain closed in 1846
Railway stations in Great Britain opened in 1846
SPT railway stations
Railway stations served by ScotRail
Buildings and structures in Kilmarnock
1843 establishments in Scotland